Sante is both a masculine Italian given name and a surname. Notable people with the name include:

Given name:
Sante Bentivoglio (1426–1462), Italian nobleman
Sante Geronimo Caserio (1873–1894), Italian anarchist and assassin
Sante Cattaneo (1739–1819), Italian Neoclassic painter
Sante Ceccherini (1863–1932), Italian fencer
Sante Gaiardoni (born 1939), Italian cyclist
Sante Geminiani (1919–1951), Italian motorcycle racer
Sante Graziani (1920–2005), American artist
Sante Kimes (1934–2014), American murderer
Sante Lombardo (1504–1560), Italian architect
Sante Marsili (born 1950), Italian water polo player
Sante Monachesi (born 1910), Italian painter
Sante Poromaa (born 1958), Swedish Zen Buddhist priest
Sante De Sanctis (1862–1935), Italian psychologist
Sante Vandi (1653–1716), Italian Baroque painter

Surname:
Lucy Sante (born 1954), Belgian-American writer and critic

See also
"Santé" (song), a 2021 song by Belgian singer Stromae
Sante River, river in Michigan, United States

Italian masculine given names